Royal Württemberg Jagdstaffel 64, commonly abbreviated to Jasta 64, was a "hunting group" (i.e., fighter squadron) of the Luftstreitkräfte, the air arm of the Imperial German Army during World War I. The squadron would score 20 or more aerial victories during the war. The unit's victories came at the expense of three wounded in action, and three taken prisoner of war.

History

On 23 January 1918, Jasta 64 was founded at Fliegerersatz-Abteilung ("Replacement Detachment") 10, Böblingen. The new squadron was posted to 5 Armee on 4 February 1918 to begin operations. Its first aerial victory claim was submitted on 14 March. On 22 March 1918, Jasta 64 was posted to Armee-Abteilung C, and would remain in that posting through war's end. The three Jasta 64 POWS were Off stv Schueschke on March 27, 1918; and Vzfw Anton Wroniecki (shot down by Douglas Campbell) and Uffz Heinrich Simon (shot down by Alan Winslow) April 14, 1918.

Commanding officers (Staffelführer)
 August Hanko: 24 January 1918 – 7 July 1918
 Eugen Siempelkamp: 25 July 1918 – 14 September 1918
 Friedrich Hengst: 14 September 1918 – war's end

Duty stations
 Mercy-le-Haut, France: 4 February 1918
 Mars-la-Tour, France: 22 March 1918

Aircraft
Originally equipped with Albatros and Pfalz fighters, the later Fokker D.VII fighters scored most aerial victories for the Jasta.

References

Bibliography
 

64
Military units and formations established in 1918
1918 establishments in Germany
Military units and formations disestablished in 1918